Cyperus sensilis is a species of sedge that is native to parts of South Africa.

See also 
 List of Cyperus species

References 

sensilis
Plants described in 1976
Flora of South Africa